The men's 1 km time trial at the 2022 Commonwealth Games was part of the cycling programme, which took place on 1 August 2022.

Records
Prior to this competition, the existing world and Games records were as follows:

Results

References

Men's 1 km time trial
Cycling at the Commonwealth Games – Men's 1 km time trial